Pompographa is a genus of moth in the family Lecithoceridae. It contains the species Pompographa philosopha, which is found in India (Assam).

The wingspan is 13–15 mm. The forewings are rather dark fuscous with an irregularly triangular blotch of dark fuscous suffusion on the dorsum before the middle, reaching more than half across the wing. The costa is suffused with dark fuscous from one-third to the apex and a small whitish spot on the middle of the costa, beneath which is a patch of whitish irroration. There are two small blackish spots edged with a few whitish scales placed transversely in the disc at three-fifths and an indistinct bi-sinuate whitish line at four-fifths, sharply marked towards the costa. There is also a black terminal line. The hindwings are grey.

References

Natural History Museum Lepidoptera genus database

Lecithoceridae
Monotypic moth genera
Moths of Asia